Lucy Tayiah Eads or Cha-me (also known as Chief Lucy) (1888–1961) was elected the first female tribal chief of the Kaw Indians in 1922. She was the first chief of the Kaws since 1908.

Personal life

Lucy Tayiah was born in 1888 in Indian Territory, along Beaver Creek. Her parents were Lezitte Betrand (also known as Mo Jan Ah Hoe) and Little Tayiah. Her mother, Lezitte Betrand, was Kaw and Potawatomi. Little Tayiah, her father, was Kaw. Taiyah also had one brother, Emmett (also known as Ki He Kah Mah She).

Around 1892, both of her parents died of starvation. Tayiah and her brother became orphans. They were adopted by Chief Washunga. Their adoption by the Kaw tribal chief was part of tribal tradition. She attended Haskell Indian College in Lawrence, Kansas, where she studied nursing. She moved to New York City. She married Herbert Edward Kimber around 1908. They had three children, all girls. Eventually they divorced. She married John Rhea Eads around 1913. They would have six more children.

After serving as tribal chief, Eads returned to working as a nurse at Haskell Indian College. She, with her family, eventually relocated to Pawhuska, Oklahoma. She died in 1961.

Chief Lucy

Chief Washungah died in 1908. It was not until 1922 that the Kaws would have another tribal leader. Eads was elected in November of that year. She was the first woman to become tribal chief of the Kaw. She was voted in by eight council members. Eads went by the name Chief Lucy during her tenure as chief. She tried to gain recognition for the tribe from the federal government, in 1924, but this was said to be contrary to the Allotment Agreement and denied. In 1929, she attended the Inauguration of Herbert Hoover, representing the Kaw Nation. In 1928, after Eads was reelected, the Kaw government was abolished until its restoration under the Oklahoma Indian Welfare Act of 1936.

References

External links

20th-century Native Americans
1888 births
1961 deaths
Kaw people
Native American leaders
American women in politics
People from Pawhuska, Oklahoma
Haskell Indian Nations University alumni
Female Native American leaders
20th-century American women politicians
20th-century American politicians
20th-century Native American women